The Journal of Chemical Ecology is a monthly peer-reviewed scientific journal published by Springer Science+Business Media covering all aspects of chemical ecology. The journal was established in 1975 and is the official journal of the International Society of Chemical Ecologists and the Asia-Pacific Association of Chemical Ecologists. The editor-in-chief is Gary W. Felton (Pennsylvania State University). According to the Journal Citation Reports, the journal has a 2013 impact factor of 2.239.

References

External links 
 

Springer Science+Business Media academic journals
Monthly journals
Ecology journals
English-language journals
Publications established in 1975